Kim Nam-chun (19 April 1989 – 30 October 2020) was a South Korean footballer who played as a defender.

Club career 
Kim Nam-chun made his debut for FC Seoul against Buriram United in the group stages of the AFC Champions League on 1 May 2013.

His first goal for FC Seoul came against Ulsan Hyundai in a K League Classic match on 9 October 2014.

Death 
On 30 October 2020, Kim Nam-chun was found dead in a parking lot in Songpa. South Korean police suspected that he died by suicide.

Honours

Clubs 

 K League 1: 2016
 FA Cup: 2015

References

External links 
 
 Kim Nam-chun interview at Kwangwoon University
 Kim Nam-chun interview at FC Seoul

1989 births
2020 deaths
2020 suicides
Association football central defenders
South Korean footballers
FC Seoul players
Gimcheon Sangmu FC players
K League 1 players
Sportspeople from Incheon
Suicides in South Korea